The Jubilee Medal "20 Years of Independence of Turkmenistan" is a Turkmen state award which was unveiled in 2011 to honour the 20th anniversary of Turkmenistan's independence in 1991.

Recipients 
Gurbanguly Berdimuhamedow
Ýaýlym Berdiýew
Kasymguly Babaýew
Maýa Gulyýewa 
Gülşat Mämmedowa

See also 
Independence Day (Turkmenistan)

References 

Medals
Awards established in 2011
Orders, decorations, and medals of Turkmenistan